Johan Koren Christie may refer to:
Johan Koren Christie (writer) (1814–1885), Norwegian writer
Johan Koren Christie (officer) (1909–1995), Norwegian engineer and air force officer

See also
Christie (surname)